List of massacres in Afghanistan
 List of massacres against Hazara people
 List of massacres in Albania
 List of massacres in Algeria
 List of massacres in Argentina
 List of massacres in Australia
 List of massacres in Azerbaijan
 List of massacres in Bangladesh
 List of massacres in Belarus
 List of massacres in Belgium
 List of massacres in Bolivia
 List of massacres in Brazil
 List of massacres in Burundi
 List of massacres in Canada
 List of massacres in Chile
 List of massacres in China
 List of massacres in Colombia
 List of massacres in Cyprus
 List of massacres in East Timor
 List of massacres in Egypt
 List of massacres in El Salvador
 List of massacres in Ethiopia
 List of massacres in Finland
 List of massacres in France
 List of massacres in Germany
 List of massacres in Great Britain
 List of massacres in Greece
 List of massacres in Guatemala
 List of massacres in Guyana
 List of massacres in Haiti
 List of massacres in Hungary
 List of massacres in India
 List of massacres in Indonesia
 List of massacres in Iran
 List of massacres in Iraq
 List of massacres in Ireland
 List of massacres in Israel
List of massacres in Jerusalem
 List of massacres in Italy
 List of massacres in Jamaica
 List of massacres in Japan
 List of massacres in Kenya
 List of massacres in Kosovo
 List of massacres in Latvia
 List of massacres in Lebanon
 List of massacres in Libya
 List of massacres in Lithuania
 List of massacres in Malaysia
 List of massacres in Mexico
 List of massacres in Myanmar
 List of massacres in Nepal
 List of massacres in New Zealand
 List of massacres in Nigeria
 List of massacres in North Korea
 List of massacres in North Macedonia
 List of massacres in Ottoman Bulgaria
 List of massacres in Ottoman Syria
 List of massacres in Pakistan
 List of massacres in Palestine
 List of killings and massacres in Mandatory Palestine
 List of massacres in Peru
 List of massacres in Poland
 List of massacres in Puerto Rico
 List of massacres in Roman Judea
 List of massacres in Romania
 List of massacres in Russia
 List of massacres in Rwanda
 List of massacres in Serbia
 List of massacres in Singapore
 List of massacres in Slovakia
 List of massacres in Slovenia
 List of massacres in South Africa
 List of massacres in South Korea
 List of massacres in Spain
 List of massacres in Sri Lanka
 List of massacres in Sudan
 List of massacres in Switzerland
 List of massacres in Syria
 List of massacres in São Tomé and Príncipe
 List of massacres in Taiwan
 List of massacres in Thailand
 List of massacres in Turkey
 List of massacres in Ukraine
 List of massacres in Venezuela
 List of massacres in Vietnam
 List of massacres in Yemen
 List of massacres in Yugoslavia
 List of mass executions and massacres in Yugoslavia during World War II
 List of massacres in the Bosnian War
 List of massacres in the Croatian War of Independence
 List of massacres in the Czech Republic
 List of massacres in the Dominican Republic
 List of massacres in the Philippines
 List of massacres in the Solomon Islands
 List of massacres in the Soviet Union
 List of massacres in the United States

See also 
 List of lists organized by death toll